Rathfran Stone Circle is a stone circle and National Monument located in County Mayo, Ireland.

Location

Rathfran Stone Circles is located to the west of Killala Bay, northeast of Summerhill House.

History

The stone circles were built c. 2500 BC.

Description

Northeast circle
It is composed of 16 stones. Many of the stones are large blocks up to 1.5 m (5 ft) high.

Southwest circle
Consists of 8 stones on a raised platform.

References

National Monuments in County Mayo
Archaeological sites in County Mayo